Quinn Wilder is a Canadian author of contemporary romance novels. Thirteen of her novels were published in Harlequin Romance line. Her novels have been translated into several languages, including Swedish.

Works
That Man from Texas (1985)
To Tame a Wild Heart (1987)
Daughter of the Stars (1987)
High Heaven (1989)
Macnamara's Bride (1989)
Outlaw Heart (1990)
Ride a Storm (1991)
Devon's Desire (1991)
Build a Dream (1993)
One Shining Summer (1993)
Dream Man (1994)
Heart's Refuge (1995)
Untamed Melody (1995)

References

Living people
20th-century Canadian novelists
20th-century Canadian women writers
Canadian romantic fiction writers
Canadian women novelists
Year of birth missing (living people)